Sharon Vaughn is an American politician who serves as a at-large representative on the Philadelphia City Council since 2022.

Career 
Vaughn served on Marian B. Tasco's staff before becoming chief of staff for Derek S. Green. When Green resigned to run for mayor, Vaughn was unanimously picked by city ward leaders to replace him in the special election. She defeated Republican Jim Hasher in the general election on November 8, 2022. She is also a ward leader on the City Committee. She will represent all of Philadelphia as one of the seven at-large members on the council.

References 

Living people
1964 births
Pennsylvania Democrats
Politicians from Philadelphia
21st-century American politicians
21st-century American women politicians
Philadelphia City Council members